Presidential elections were held in Brazil on 1 March 1914. The result was a victory for Venceslau Brás of the Minas Republican Party, who received 91.6% of the vote.

Results

References

Presidential elections in Brazil
Brazil
1914 in Brazil
March 1914 events
Election and referendum articles with incomplete results
Elections of the First Brazilian Republic